In mathematics, the Novikov–Veselov equation (or Veselov–Novikov equation) is a natural (2+1)-dimensional analogue of the Korteweg–de Vries (KdV) equation. Unlike another (2+1)-dimensional analogue of KdV, the Kadomtsev–Petviashvili equation, it is integrable via the inverse scattering transform for the 2-dimensional stationary Schrödinger equation. Similarly, the Korteweg–de Vries equation is integrable via the inverse scattering transform for the 1-dimensional Schrödinger equation.

Definition
The Novikov–Veselov equation is most commonly written as

where   and the following standard notation of complex analysis is used:  is the real part,

The function  is generally considered to be real-valued. The function  is an auxiliary function defined via  up to a holomorphic summand,  is a real parameter corresponding to the energy level of the related 2-dimensional Schrödinger equation

Relation to other nonlinear integrable equations
If in the Novikov–Veselov equation , then the equation reduces to another (2+1)-dimensional analogue of the KdV equation, the Kadomtsev–Petviashvili equation (to KP-I and KP-II, respectively) .

History
The inverse scattering transform method for solving nonlinear partial differential equations (PDEs) begins with the discovery of C.S. Gardner, J.M. Greene, M.D. Kruskal, R.M. Miura , who demonstrated that the Korteweg–de Vries equation can be integrated via the inverse scattering problem for the 1-dimensional stationary Schrödinger equation. The algebraic nature of this discovery was revealed by Lax who showed that the Korteweg–de Vries equation can be written in the following operator form (the so-called Lax pair):

Equation is a compatibility condition for the equations

Afterwards, a representation of the form was found for many other physically interesting nonlinear equations, like the Kadomtsev–Petviashvili equation, sine-Gordon equation, nonlinear Schrödinger equation and others. This led to an extensive development of the theory of inverse scattering transform for integrating nonlinear partial differential equations.

However, S.V. Manakov showed that in the two-dimensional case it is more correct to consider the following representation (further called the Manakov L-A-B triple):

or, equivalently, to search for the condition of compatibility of the equations

at one fixed value of parameter  .

The authors also constructed a hierarchy of evolution equations integrable via the inverse scattering transform for the 2-dimensional Schrödinger equation at fixed energy. This set of evolution equations (which is sometimes called the hierarchy of the Novikov–Veselov equations) contains, in particular, the equation.

Physical applications
The dispersionless version of the Novikov–Veselov equation was derived in a model of nonlinear geometrical optics .

Behavior of solutions
The behavior of solutions to the Novikov–Veselov equation depends essentially on the regularity of the scattering data for this solution. If the scattering data are regular, then the solution vanishes uniformly with time. If the scattering data have singularities, then the solution may develop solitons. For example, the scattering data of the Grinevich–Zakharov soliton solutions of the Novikov–Veselov equation have singular points.

Solitons are traditionally a key object of study in the theory of nonlinear integrable equations. The solitons of the Novikov–Veselov equation at positive energy are transparent potentials, similarly to the one-dimensional case (in which solitons are reflectionless potentials). However, unlike the one-dimensional case where there exist well-known exponentially decaying solitons, the Novikov–Veselov equation (at least at non-zero energy) does not possess exponentially localized solitons .

References
 
 
  (English translation: Russian Math. Surveys 31 (1976), no. 5, 245–246.)

External links
 
 The inverse scattering method for the Novikov–Veselov equation

Partial differential equations
Exactly solvable models
Integrable systems
Solitons